Delphine Chanéac (born 14 November 1978) is a French model, actress and disc jockey. She was born in Valence, France.

Career
Chanéac worked in the French cinema, appearing in European films and television in the late 1990s and 2000s. She is best known for her role as Pauline in the French sitcom La Vie Devant Nous and for portraying the genetic hybrid Dren in the Canadian science fiction/horror movie Splice, shaving her head for the role. She also starred in the crime thriller Verso.

Theater

Filmography

Books

References

External links

 
 Interview at TwitchFilm.net

1978 births
French film actresses
Living people
French female models
People from Rueil-Malmaison
21st-century French actresses